The Bon Secours Hospital, Cork is a private hospital in Cork, Ireland. The hospital is part of Bon Secours Mercy Health. This includes sister hospitals in Dublin, Galway, Limerick and Tralee.
The hospital has over 18,000 admissions and 29,000 outpatients attendances per year.

History
The separate hospital and convent blocks in Cork were commissioned by the Bon Secours Sisters and completed in 1915.

Services
The hospital has 343 in-patient beds.  There are 30 day case beds, 30 endoscopy beds and 6 oncology day spaces. The hospital has 5 major and 2 minor operating theatres.  Services provided include cardiology, diagnostic imaging, nutrition and dietetics, histopathology, pharmacy, physiotherapy, respiratory medicine, angiography, cardiac rehabilitation, diabetes specialist services, intensive care, and oncology.
In 2008 the hospital opened a Rapid Access Chest Pain clinic  for same day assessment of chest pain referred patients.
In 2009 the hospital opened a Specialist Breast Care Clinic 
which offers a triple assessment to patients within 3 days of referral.
In 2011 in co-operation with the Irish Cancer Society, a Daffodil Centre was opened in the hospital to provide information services to patients their families and the general public.
The hospital is a centre for surgical solutions for morbid obesity.
The Bon Secours Cork Cancer Centre in association with UPMC opened in 2019

Accreditation
The hospital received Joint Commission International accreditation in 2005.

See also
 Bon Secours Hospital, Dublin
 Bon Secours Hospital, Galway
 Bon Secours Hospital, Tralee

References

Bon Secours Sisters
Hospital buildings completed in 1915
Hospitals in County Cork
Hospitals established in 1915
1915 establishments in Ireland
Private hospitals in the Republic of Ireland